"Lineage" is the 158th episode of the TV series Star Trek: Voyager, the 12th episode of the seventh season. B'Elanna and Tom Paris struggle through the pregnancy of their child.

This episode aired on the United Paramount Network (UPN) on January 24, 2001.

Plot
B'Elanna Torres is in a good mood, until she arrives at work in Engineering and almost faints. Icheb scans her and states that she has a parasite within her. Seven of Nine also scans Torres and comes up with a different diagnosis: B'Elanna is pregnant.

The Doctor confirms Seven's diagnosis. The fetus is seven weeks old, and perfectly healthy, except for a genetic defect that causes abnormal spine curvature in Klingon females. B'Elanna, who is half Klingon, had surgery as a baby to correct this defect. The Doctor says that nowadays genetic resequencing is the preferred treatment and that he can perform the procedure the following day. He also shows Tom Paris and B'Elanna a holographic projection of what their daughter will look like. Tom thinks she is beautiful but B'Elanna is distressed to learn her daughter will have Klingon facial ridges.

During the procedure the next day, B'Elanna reminisces back to her childhood as a Klingon girl on the colony in which she grew up. She blames herself, especially her Klingon half, for her human father leaving her, and her teasing and harassment by other children for being half Klingon, and resolves to not let the same happen to her daughter. She proposes further genetic resequencing to delete various Klingon genes in order to make her daughter fully human, but the Doctor and B'Elanna's husband Tom Paris disagree.

During one of the couple's arguments, Torres mentions Voyager has 140 humans on board (not intended as a full crew count, as Vulcans, Bolians, Bajorans, and other aliens are also part of the crew).  She claims that if her daughter is even one quarter Klingon, human society will treat her as a "monster". They cannot reach a consensus, so they speak to Janeway, who tells them that their problem is not about ethics, it is about marital affairs. As a friend, she will offer them advice; but as the captain, she will not overrule the Doctor. They still cannot work it out, so Paris ends up staying the night in Harry's quarters. The next day, they have seemed to make up, but just then, the Doctor calls them.

In Sickbay, the Doctor reveals that he has changed his mind and believes that the procedure will be required. Tom is disturbed by this and seeks a second opinion from Icheb. Icheb discovers an error in the Doctor's new assessment and Seven discovers that the EMH's program has been tampered with. Tom stops the procedure in the nick of time, and he and B'Elanna have an argument. She tearfully admits what she fears will happen to her daughter; that Paris will leave them like her father left her and her mother, and Tom reaffirms his commitment to his growing family. The Doctor's alterations are removed, and B'Elanna apologizes to the Doctor and asks him to be the godfather. The Doctor accepts, and B'Elanna feels the baby kick. She then sees the holographic projection one more time and admits that she is cute.

Reception 
In 2012, in a review of the series, Den of Geek ranked this the tenth best episode of Star Trek:  Voyager. In 2019, they also ranked this the 10th best morality play of the Star Trek franchise.

Io9's 2014 listing of the top 100 Star Trek episodes placed "Lineage" as the 96th best episode of all series up to that time, out of over 700 episodes.

In 2021, The Digital Fix noted this as another episode that uses Torres' Klingon heritage as a plot element, but in this case also explores her relationship with her father using the flashbacks.

In 2021, SyFy said this was a "gut wrenching" episode, as B'Elanna is challenged by pregnancy and family heritage.

Home media releases 
On December 21, 2003, this episode was released on DVD as part of a Season 7 boxset; Star Trek Voyager: Complete Seventh Season.

See also
Author, Author (Star Trek: Voyager)
The "Torres Trilogy": 
Day of Honor (S4E3)
Extreme Risk (Star Trek: Voyager) (S5E3)
Barge of the Dead (S6E3)

References

External links
 

Star Trek: Voyager (season 7) episodes
2001 American television episodes